Joe Minucci (born November 6, 1981) is a former American football defensive lineman who played four seasons in the Arena Football League with the Nashville Kats and Cleveland Gladiators. He played college football at University of Delaware. He was also a member of the New York Jets, Tennessee Valley Vipers, Tennessee Titans, New Orleans Saints and Baltimore Ravens.

College career
Minucci played for the Delaware Fightin' Blue Hens from 1999 to 2002, earning All-Atlantic 10 Conference honors his senior season in 2002 and helping the Hens advance to the 2000 NCAA Division I-AA championship playoff semifinals.

Professional career

New York Jets
Minucci signed with the New York Jets on June 25, 2003 after going undrafted in the 2003 NFL Draft. He was released by the Jets on July 15, 2003.

Tennessee Valley Vipers
Minucci played for the Tennessee Valley Vipers of the af2 in 2004.

Nashville Kats
Minucci was signed by the Nashville Kats on October 14, 2004. He played for the Kats from 2005 to 2007, earning Second Team All-Arena honors in 2006 and All-Rookie Team recognition in 2005.

Tennessee Titans
Minucci signed with the Tennessee Titans on July 19, 2005. He was released by the Titans on August 29, 2005.

New Orleans Saints
Minucci was signed by the New Orleans Saints on August 3, 2006. He was released by the Saints on September 2, 2006.

Baltimore Ravens
Minucci was signed to the Baltimore Ravens' practice squad on January 7, 2007.

Cleveland Gladiators
Minucci was selected by the Cleveland Gladiators with the first overall pick in the AFL Dispersal Draft on October 26, 2007. He played for the Gladiators during the 2008 season.

References

External links
Just Sports Stats

Living people
1981 births
Players of American football from New York (state)
American football defensive linemen
Delaware Fightin' Blue Hens football players
Tennessee Valley Vipers players
Nashville Kats players
Cleveland Gladiators players
People from Lindenhurst, New York